Wayne Martin (born 23 December 1955) is a New Zealand former cricketer. He played one first-class and two List A matches for Otago between 1976 and 1979.

See also
 List of Otago representative cricketers

References

External links
 

1955 births
Living people
New Zealand cricketers
Otago cricketers
People from Mosgiel